The Grovewood Awards (later becoming the Cellnet Awards and then the McLaren Autosport BRDC Awards) were a series of British motor racing awards presented each year in the United Kingdom to the year's up-and-coming British and Commonwealth racing drivers. The monetary award recipients were selected by a judging panel appointed by the UK's Guild of Motoring Writers.

History
The awards were inaugurated in 1963 by John Webb of Grovewood Securities, with the intention of providing monetary assistance for promising young British and Commonwealth motor racing drivers. Grovewood, the owners of four racing circuits in the UK, wanted to recognise and foster young racing talent.

In 1987 the awards were taken over by Cellnet and became known as the Cellnet Awards.

Winners

References